The Rape of Europa is a 1772 painting created by Spanish romantic painter and printmaker Francisco José de Goya y Lucientes (1746–1828) depicting Europa's abduction by the Greek god Zeus in the form of a bull. The classical theme from Greek mythology has also been painted by numerous Old Masters.

See also
 Depictions of Europa in art and literature
List of works by Francisco Goya

Bibliography
Instituto del Patrimonio Cultural de España

References

External links

Paintings by Francisco Goya
Paintings of Europa (consort of Zeus)
1772 paintings
Cattle in art